The Roman Catholic Archdiocese of Riga is an archdiocese administered from the capital city of Riga in Latvia. Its cathedral is Svētā Jēkaba Katedrāle. It is a metropolitan archdiocese which also helps to administer three suffragan dioceses in the Ecclesiastical province of Riga in Latvia.

History
 1186: Established as Diocese of Üxküll
 1 October 1188: Designated a suffragan of the Metropolitan Archdiocese of Hamburg-Bremen, Germany
 1202: Renamed as Diocese of Riga
 20 January 1255: Promoted as Metropolitan Archdiocese of Riga
 1561: Suppressed
 22 September 1918: Restored as Diocese of Riga from territory of Vidzeme, Latgale, and Estonia
 9 June 1920: Added territory of Courland and Zemgale from Diocese of Samogitia
 25 October 1923: Promoted as Archdiocese of Riga
 1 November 1924: Lost territory to new Apostolic Administration of Estonia
 8 May 1937: Promoted as Metropolitan Archdiocese of Riga; lost territory to new Diocese of Liepāja
 2 December 1995: Lost territory to new Diocese of Rēzekne–Aglona

Bishops, Apostolic Administrators and Archbishops of Riga (Roman rite)

Archdiocese of Riga
Elevated:  1252
Suppressed: 1540
Albert Suerber, O.P. (1253 – 1273 Died) 
Juan de Luna (17 May 1274 – 1286 Died) 
Jens Grand (30 Mar 1302 – 1304 Resigned) 
Johann Walenrode (27 Sep 1393 – 30 May 1418 Appointed, Archbishop (Personal Title) of Liège) 
Johann Abundi (11 Jul 1418 – 1424 Died) 
Silvester Stodewescher (09 Oct 1448 – 12 Jul 1479)
Michael Hildebrand (4 Jun 1484 – 5 Feb 1509 Died)
Jasper Linde (23 May 1509 – 29 Jun 1524)

Diocese of Riga
Erected: 22 September 1918
Bishop Eduard O’Rourke (29 Sep 1918 – 10 Apr 1920)
Bishop Antonijs Springovičs (14 Apr 1920 – 25 Oct 1923) (As Bishop of Riga)

Archdiocese of Riga
Elevated: 25 October 1923
Archbishop Antonijs Springovičs (25 Oct 1923 – 1 Oct 1958) (As Archbishop of Riga)
Bishop Pēteris Strods (1 Oct 1958 – 5 Aug 1960) (Apostolic Administrator)
Cardinal Julijans Vaivods (10 Nov 1964 – 24 May 1990) (Apostolic Administrator)
Bishop Jānis Cakuls (23 May 1990 – 8 May 1991) (Apostolic Administrator)
Cardinal Jānis Pujats (8 May 1991 – 19 Jun 2010)
Archbishop Zbigņevs Stankevičs (19 Jun 2010 – )

Suffragan dioceses
 Jelgava
 Liepāja
 Rēzekne-Aglona

See also
Roman Catholicism in Latvia
Concordat of 1922

Sources
 GCatholic.org
 Catholic Hierarchy

References

Roman Catholic dioceses in Latvia
Christian organizations established in 1918
Roman Catholic dioceses and prelatures established in the 20th century
1918 establishments in Europe